Alice Castello is a comune (municipality) in the Province of Vercelli in the Italian region Piedmont, located about  northeast of Turin and about  west of Vercelli.

Alice is known since the 10th century AD. Located there are a castle (of which only few remains of the medieval structure have survived) and an 18th-century parish church dedicated to St. Nicholas.

References

Cities and towns in Piedmont